

The Mercury Chic T-2 was a lightweight American parasol wing monoplane designed and built by the Mercury Aircraft Inc. in the late 1920s. Flown for the first time in 1928, about 27 were built, but due to the early 1930s economic depression only 15 were sold, and the rest were scrapped.

Design
The Chic T-2 had a fabric-covered welded-steel tube fuselage with a parasol wing. It had a fixed conventional landing gear and two tandem open cockpits for the pilot and pupil. Originally flown with a  Viele radial engine, this was soon replaced with a more powerful  LeBlond 7D radial engine.

Surviving aircraft
A Mercury Chic T-2 (NC53N) is on display at the Glenn H. Curtiss Museum in Hammondsport, New York.

Specifications

References

Notes

Bibliography

1920s United States civil trainer aircraft
Parasol-wing aircraft